Philip Henningsson (born 14 June 1995) is a Swedish handball player for IFK Kristianstad and the Swedish national team.

He participated at the 2018 European Men's Handball Championship.

References

External links

1995 births
Living people
People from Hörby Municipality
Swedish male handball players
IFK Kristianstad players
Sportspeople from Skåne County
21st-century Swedish people